The Crișul Mic is a left tributary of the Crișul Negru in Bihor County, western Romania. It joins the Crișul Negru downstream of Ginta.

References

Rivers of Romania
Rivers of Bihor County